Myst is a franchise centered on a series of adventure video games. The first game in the series, Myst, was released in 1993 by brothers Rand and Robyn Miller and their video game company Cyan, Inc. The first sequel to Myst, Riven, was released in 1997 and was followed by three more direct sequels: Myst III: Exile in 2001, Myst IV: Revelation in 2004, and Myst V: End of Ages in 2005. A spinoff featuring a multiplayer component, Uru: Ages Beyond Myst, was released in 2003 and followed by two expansion packs.

Mysts story concerns an explorer named Atrus who has the ability to write books that serve as links to other worlds, known as Ages. This practice of creating linking books was developed by an ancient civilization known as the D'ni, whose society crumbled after being ravaged by disease. The player takes the role of an unnamed person referred to as the Stranger and assists Atrus by traveling to other Ages and solving puzzles. Over the course of the series, Atrus writes a new Age for the D'ni survivors to live on, and players of the games set the course the civilization will follow.

The brothers developed Myst after producing award-winning games for children. Drawing on childhood stories, the brothers spent months designing the Ages players would investigate. The name Myst came from Jules Verne's novel The Mysterious Island. After Riven was released, Robyn left Cyan to pursue other projects, and Cyan began developing Uru;  developers Presto Studios and Ubisoft created Exile and Revelation before Cyan returned to complete the series with End of Ages. Myst and its sequels were critical and commercial successes, selling more than twelve million copies; the games drove sales of personal computers and CD-ROM drives as well as attracting casual gamers with its nonviolent, methodical gameplay. The video games' success has led to three published novels in addition to soundtracks, a comic series, and television and movie pitches.

Story

Mysts story begins with the arrival of a people known as the D'ni on Earth, almost 10,000 years ago. The D'ni  are an ancient race who used a special skill to create magical books that  serve as portals to the worlds they describe, known as Ages. The D'ni build a great city and thriving civilization in caverns. A young geologist from the surface, Anna, stumbled upon the D'ni civilization. Learning the D'ni language, Anna becomes known as Ti'ana and marries a D'ni named Aitrus; the couple have a son named Gehn. Soon after, D'ni is ravaged by a plague created by a man named A'Gaeris. Aitrus sacrifices himself to save his wife and child, killing A'Gaeris while Ti'ana and Gehn escape to the surface as  the D'ni civilization falls.

Ti'ana raises Gehn until he runs away as a teenager, learning the D'ni Art of writing descriptive books. Ti'ana also cares for Gehn's son, Atrus, until Gehn arrives to teach Atrus the Art. Atrus realizes that his father is reckless and power-hungry, and with the help of Ti'ana and a young woman, Catherine, Atrus traps Gehn on his Age of Riven with no linking books. Atrus and Catherine marry and have two children, Sirrus and Achenar. The brothers grow greedy, and, after plundering their father's Ages, they trap Catherine on Riven. When Atrus returns to investigate, the brothers strand him in a D'ni cavern before they themselves are trapped by special "prison" books. Through the help of a Stranger, Atrus is freed and sends his benefactor to Riven to retrieve Catherine from the clutches of Gehn. Sirrus and Achenar are punished for their crimes by being imprisoned in separate Ages until they reform.

Atrus writes a new Age called Releeshahn for the D'ni survivors to rebuild their civilization as he and Catherine settle back on Earth, raising a daughter named Yeesha. As Atrus prepares to take the Stranger to Releeshahn, a mysterious man named Saavedro appears and steals the Releeshahn Descriptive Book. The Stranger follows Saavedro through several Ages (which were used to train Sirrus and Achenar in the art of writing Ages) before finally recovering the book. Ten years later, Atrus asks for the Stranger's help in determining if his sons have repented after their lengthy imprisonment; the Stranger saves Yeesha from Sirrus's machinations, but Sirrus and a repentant Achenar are killed. D'ni is not fully restored until the creatures the D'ni enslaved, known as the Bahro, are freed.

Games

Development

Myst was originally conceptualized by brothers Rand and Robyn Miller. The Millers had created fictional worlds and stories as young children, influenced by the works of authors such as J. R. R. Tolkien, Robert A. Heinlein, and Isaac Asimov. They formed a video game company together called Cyan, Inc.; their first game, called The Manhole, won the Software Publishers Association award in 1988 for best use of the digital medium. Cyan produced other games, aimed at children; the Millers eventually decided their next project would be made for adults.

The brothers spent months designing the Ages comprising the game, which were influenced by earlier whimsical "worlds" Cyan had made for children's games.  The game's name, as well as the overall solitary and mysterious atmosphere of the island, was inspired by the book The Mysterious Island by Jules Verne. Robyn's unfinished novel, Dunnyhut, influenced aspects of Mysts story, which was developed bit by bit as the brothers conceptualized the various worlds. As development progressed, the Millers realized that they would need to have even more story and history than would be revealed in the game itself. Realizing that fans would enjoy getting a deeper look at the story not in the games, the Millers produced a rough draft of what would become a novel, Myst: The Book of Atrus.

After the enormous response to Myst, work quickly began on the next Myst game. Cyan moved from their garage to a new office and hired additional programmers, designers, and artists. The game was to ship in late 1996, but the release was pushed back a year. Development costs were between $5 and $10 million, many times Mysts budget. After the release of Riven, Robyn Miller left the company to pursue other projects, while Rand stayed behind to work on a Myst franchise.

While Rand Miller stated Cyan would not make another sequel to Myst, Mattel (then the owner of the Myst franchise) offered the task of developing a sequel to several video game companies who created detailed story proposals and technology demonstrations. Presto Studios, makers of the Journeyman Project adventure games, was hired to develop Myst III. Presto spent millions developing the game and used the studio's entire staff to complete the project, which took two and a half years to develop. Soon after Myst III: Exile was released, Presto was shut down, and Exile publisher Ubisoft developed the sequel, Myst IV: Revelation, internally. Meanwhile, Cyan produced the spinoff title Uru: Ages Beyond Myst, which included an aborted multiplayer component allowing players to cooperatively solve puzzles.

Cyan returned to produce what was billed as the final game in the series, discarding live action sequences embedded in prerendered graphics for a world rendered in real time. The actors' faces were turned into textures and mapped onto digital characters, with the actor's actions synchronized by motion capture. Shortly before release, Cyan closed down development, although this did not impact the release of the game; the company was able to rehire its employees a few weeks later, and continued to work on non-Myst projects and an attempted resurrection of Urus multiplayer component, Myst Online. Servers paid for by donation were set up in 2010, and the game went open-source in 2011.

Among the detailed elements of the Myst universe Cyan created was the language and culture of the D'ni. The civilization's numbers and writing first appeared in Riven, and were important to solving some of the game's puzzles. The D'ni language was the language presented in various games and novels of the Myst franchise, created by Richard A. Watson. Several online D'ni dictionaries have been developed as part of the ongoing fan-based culture associated with the game.

Music

The music for each game in the Myst series has fallen to various composers. Originally, the Millers believed that any music or sound besides ambient noise would distract the player from the game and ruin the sense of reality; Myst, therefore, was to have no music at all. A sound test eventually persuaded the developers that music heightened the sense of immersion rather than lessening it, and as such Robyn Miller composed 40 minutes of synthesized music for the game. He would also produce the music for Riven, which featured leitmotifs for each of the main characters. Virgin Records bought the rights to the music and produced the soundtracks, which were released in 1998.

For Myst III: Exile and Myst IV: Revelation, composer Jack Wall created the music, developing a more active musical style different from Miller's ambient themes. Wall looked at the increasing complexity of games as an opportunity to give players a soundtrack with as much force as a movie score, and tried to create a distinctive sound that was still recognizable as Myst music. In Revelation, Wall adapted the themes for the recurring characters of Myst, and collaborated with Peter Gabriel, who provided a song to the game as well as voicework.

The music for Uru: Ages Beyond Myst and Myst V: End of Ages was composed by Tim Larkin, who had gotten involved in the series doing sound design for Riven. Larkin stepped away from his background as a jazz composer and musician to create music with less structure and without a definite beginning and end. Larkin created different music depending on the location, giving each setting and Age a distinctive tone. For End of Ages, Larkin was unable to afford a full orchestra to perform his score, so he combined individual instrumentation with an array of synthesizers.

Adaptations
Rand and Robyn Miller both wanted to develop Mysts back story into novels. After the success of Myst, publisher Hyperion signed a three-book, US$1 million deal with the brothers. David Wingrove worked from the Miller brothers' story outlines. The three books — Myst: The Book of Atrus, Myst: The Book of Ti'ana, and Myst: The Book of D'ni — were released in 1995, 1996, and 1997, respectively. The books were later packaged together as The Myst Reader. A fourth novel, Myst: The Book of Marrim, was planned but has not surfaced.

Cyan partnered with Dark Horse Comics in 1993 to release a four-part comic series called Myst: The Book of Black Ships. The series would have focused on Atrus and his young sons, taking place before the events of Myst. The first issue was released on September 3, 1997, but further books were canceled after Cyan decided the first issue did not live up to expectations. Another comic, Myst #0: Passages, was later released online.

Various proposals for films and television series based on the franchise were planned or rumored but never came to fruition. They include:
 The Sci Fi Channel announced a TV miniseries in 2002, but it never materialized. According to Rand Miller, none of the various proposals met Cyan's approval, or were too formulaic or silly. 
Independent filmmakers Patrick McIntire and Adrian Vanderbosch wanted to produce a motion picture based on the story revealed in the Myst novels and in 2006 sent a DVD proposal to Cyan The film was set to be based on the novel Myst: The Book of Ti'ana, but no longer appears to be in production.
 In 2014, Legendary Entertainment announced that it was developing a television series based on Myst, but nothing came of it.

In May 2015, Unwritten: Adventures in the Ages of MYST and Beyond was published by Inkworks Productions as an authorized, Myst-based pencil-and-paper role-playing game. Unwritten was built on the popular Fate Core RPG system with a focus on investigation and non-violent adventure.  Two small supplements exist as background for game-players:  The D'Ni Primer explaining the history of the D'Ni, and The Myst Saga giving a chronology of the Myst series.

In 2016, Cyan Worlds released the Kickstarter-backed Obduction. While Obduction is not narratively linked to Myst, the game was considered by Rand Miller to be a spiritual successor to the Myst series, borrowing several of its themes and puzzle-design approaches, as well as incorporating full-motion video in homage to Myst. Robyn, who had left Cyan before this point, collaborated to help score the game and take on the role of one of the in-game characters.

In anticipation of the first game's 25th anniversary in September 2018, Cyan Worlds secured the necessary rights to release all of the Myst games, updated for modern Windows systems with assistance of GOG.com to be released as a collected physical collectors edition. Further, Cyan launched a Kickstarter in April 2018 to provide digital copies of the seven games as well as backer rewards including a simulated Linking Book, using an LCD screen inserted into a book binding.

On June 26, 2019, Village Roadshow Entertainment Group announced that they have acquired the rights to the franchise and plans to expand its mythology to develop a multi-platform universe that includes movies and TV series. They will work alongside Miller and his brother Ryan as well as Isaac Testerman and Yale Rice of Delve Media.

Reception and impact

Overall, the Myst series has been critically and commercially successful. Rand and Robyn Miller were expecting Myst to perform as well as previous Cyan titles, making enough money to fund the next project. Instead, Myst sold more than six million units, becoming the top-selling PC game of all time until The Sims surpassed Myst sales in 2002. The first three games in the series have sold more than twelve million copies.

1UP.com writer Jeremy Parish noted that there have been two main opinions of Mysts slow, puzzle-based gameplay; "Fans consider Myst an elegant, intelligent game for grown-ups, while detractors call it a soulless stroll through a digital museum, more art than game." Game industry executives were confused by Mysts success, not understanding how an "interactive slide show" turned out to be a huge hit. Online magazine writer Russell Pitts of The Escapist called Myst "unlike anything that had come before, weaving video almost seamlessly into a beautifully rendered world, presenting a captivating landscape filled with puzzles and mystery. In a game market dominated by Doom clones and simulators, Myst took us by the hand and showed us the future of gaming. It took almost a decade for anyone to follow its lead." Critics from Wired and Salon considered the games approaching the level of art, while authors Henry Jenkins and Lev Manovich pointed out the series as exemplifying the promise of new media to create unseen art forms.

The series caused a major shift in the adventure game genre. Unlike previous games, Myst attempted to keep players immersed in the world by removing all information not associated with the fictional world itself—no explanatory text, inventory, or score counters. Myst has also been cited as the reason for the decline of the adventure game genre; eager to capitalize on Mysts success, publishers churned out mediocre Myst clones, which flooded the market. By Exiles release, games like Myst were considered to be an "antiquated" form of gaming by some critics.

The title was widely credited as one of the first games to appeal not just to hardcore gamers but to casual players and demographics that generally did not play games, such as women. Mysts lack of conventional game elements—violence, dying, and failure—appealed to nongamers and those contemplating buying a computer. The Millers' decision to develop Myst for the nascent CD-ROM format helped boost interest and adoption of disc drives.

The game inspired a CD parody game called Pyst, written by comedian Peter Bergman and featured John Goodman in video scenes. Players traveled across the spoiled island of Myst after millions of players walked over it, with the parody game poking fun at elements of the prototype.

Fan conventions
The game has spawned annual fan conventions around the world. Mysterium has been held since 2000, which grew out of the plans of a small group of fans who wanted to meet in person. Approximately 200 people attended the meeting in Spokane, Washington, which was held at the headquarters of Cyan Worlds, developers of the game. Subsequent conventions have been more formally planned, involving presentations and live music. Similar to Mysterium, Mystralia is a gathering for Australia and New Zealand and has been held since 2005.

References

External links

 Cyan Worlds

 
Video game franchises
Series of books
Multimedia works
Video games set in the 19th century
Video games set in the 21st century
Video game franchises introduced in 1993
Video games adapted into novels